Paul Westbury CBE CEng FREng FICE FIStructE is the CEO of the engineering company Buro Happold.

Westbury graduated from Jesus College, Cambridge university with a first-class degree in engineering science. He then joined BuroHappold Engineering in 1991, and now is a chartered structural engineer.

He developed a specialisation in sports and entertainment buildings and has led the teams responsible for engineering on a number of award-winning projects. Following a number of senior positions within the company, Westbury took on the role of CEO at BuroHappold Engineering in March 2011.

Westbury is a Fellow of the Institution of Civil Engineers, the Royal Academy of Engineering, the Institution of Structural Engineers, and the Royal Society for Arts, Manufacture & Commerce.

He has written and presented a number of technical papers and has lectured at Cambridge, Yale, and the Massachusetts Institute of Technology (MIT).

In 2008 he was awarded a Royal Academy of Engineering Silver Medal. He was named in The Times "top 100 scientists" list for 2010, and 2 years later in 2012, he was awarded the Gold Medal of the Institution of Structural Engineers, their most prestigious award. Westbury is a judge for the Queen Elizabeth Prize for Engineering, a £1,000,000 biennial prize aimed at promoting the essential contribution of the profession around the globe.

Westbury was made a CBE in the 2013 New Year Honours.

References

Living people
Alumni of Jesus College, Cambridge
Commanders of the Order of the British Empire
Fellows of the Institution of Civil Engineers
Year of birth missing (living people)